The 2004 Al Hoceima earthquake occurred on 24 February at 02:27:47 local time near the coast of northern Morocco. The strike-slip earthquake measured 6.3 on the moment magnitude scale and had a maximum perceived intensity of IX (Violent) on the Mercalli intensity scale. Between 628 and 631 people were killed, 926 were injured, and up to 15,000 people were made homeless in the Al Hoceima-Imzourene-Beni Abdallah area.

Earthquake 

The moment tensor and pattern of surface cracks indicate left-lateral strike-slip faulting on a buried NE-SW trending fault.

This earthquake occurred near the epicenter of the magnitude 6.0 Al Hoceima earthquake of May 26, 1994, that injured one person and caused significant damage to adobe buildings.

Damage 
Ground cracks and landslides were observed between Ajdir and Beni Abdallah and maximum peak ground acceleration of 0.24g was recorded near Imzourene.

Aftershocks 
Several aftershocks killed at least three people and destroyed previously weakened buildings. This earthquake occurred near the eastern end of the Rif mountain belt, which is part of the diffuse boundary between the African and Eurasian plates.

See also
 List of earthquakes in 2004
 List of earthquakes in Morocco
 1960 Agadir earthquake
 2003 Boumerdès earthquake

References

Further reading

External links
 M6.4 Al Hoceima, Morocco Earthquake of 24 February 2004 – USGS
 Buried Strike Slip Faults: The 1994 and 2004 Al Hoceima, Morocco Earthquakes
 Moroccan Seismic Network: Overview – IRIS Consortium
 The seismic design code for buildings: A priority for seismic risk reduction in Morocco
 Preliminary Observations on the Al Hoceima, Morocco, Earthquake of February 24, 2004 – EERI
 Al-Hoceima earthquake 24 02 2004 – Patrick Murphy Corella
 Earthquake Mw 6.5 in Morocco, February 24th, 2004 – EMSC
 
 

2004 disasters in Morocco
Al Hoceima
Earthquake
Earthquakes in Morocco
February 2004 events in Africa
Al Hoceïma Province
Taounate Province
Taza Province